Clinus rotundifrons, the kelp klipfish, is a species of clinid that occurs in subtropical waters of the Atlantic Ocean from Namibia to South Africa where it inhabits kelp beds.

References

rotundifrons
Fish described in 1937
Marine fish of Africa